Throughout history there have been several mummy forgeries.

Hackensack forgery
In 1928, The Washington Post reported an event in Hackensack, New Jersey when an "Egyptian Princess" was found to be a forgery. A local minister who said he acquired it in Europe had given it to the Bergen Country Historical Society in 1902. It gained great notoriety on display in the Johnson Public Library until the curator, Mrs. Frances Westervelt, found it to be a rag-stuffed fake. The "mummy" was removed and incinerated.

Mississippi State Capitol forgery
In the 1920s, the Mississippi Department of Archives and History purchased a large collection of Native American artifacts from the nephew of Colonel Brevoort Butler after Butler's death. Included in these artifacts was one item that was clearly not of Native origin, an Egyptian mummy.  For decades this item was on display in the State Capitol Building, becoming a much-loved attraction and source of local pride.

In 1969, Gentry Yeatman, a medical student with an interest in archeology, asked the museum for human remains to study for evidence of disease. Permission was granted to remove the mummy and for it to be sent to the University of Mississippi Medical Center for an autopsy.  Radiological examination showed a few animal ribs and several square nails holding together a wooden frame.

Upon closer examination it was found to be primarily composed of papier-mâché.  German newsprint was found as well as an 1898 issue of the Milwaukee Journal.  The fake mummy has now become more famous than ever and transformed into a prized possession linked deeply to the folk history of Mississippi.

Persian Princess

The Persian Princess or Persian Mummy is a mummy of an alleged Persian princess that surfaced in Pakistani Baluchistan in October 2000.  After huge publicity and further investigation, the mummy proved to be an archaeological forgery and possibly a murder victim.

Pregnant Mummy

Researcher discover from Warsaw Mummy Project what they thought was the mummy of Egyptian priest, Hor-Djehuty was in fact a mummified corpse of a pregnant woman.

When Wężyk-Rudzki originally brought the mummy to Poland in the 19th century, he suggested that it had been found in the royal tombs in Thebes. But the archaeologists are uncertain about this or any of the mummy's background. Ejsmond explained: "We are not sure if it's true. It was quite common for people to provide false provenance to archaeologists to increase their value and significance because it looked better, so we should be very careful about such statements. There is no grounds to confirm it."

This could also go part way to explaining why the mummy as encased in a tomb with the priest's name. "This is one of the most complex matters," said Ejsmond. "We know that in ancient times coffins were reused. Sometimes tombs were robbed and stolen so that they could be reused.

Notes

See also
 Archaeological forgery
 Mummy
 Persian Princess

External links
 Mississippi Department of Archives and History
 "The "Egyptian Mummy" was a popular tourist attraction in the Mississippi Capital. The state was justifiably proud of the relic of the ancient land of the pyramids. Then came Gentry Yeatman, 22, a medical student whose school project was to x-ray the mummy and make a report to the Department of Archives and History."

Archaeological forgeries
Mummies